Hans Chrunak (born 1950 in Landskrona, Sweden) is a Swedish swimming coach.  He was the head coach of the Swedish national swim team between 1991 and 2000. From 2005 to 2007 he was the general manager of the Swedish ice hockey club Luleå HF. He has also been swimming coach for Helsingborgs SS and a swimming commentator on Sveriges Television.

In 2014 Hans Chrunak received an honorary stone on the Landskrona Walk of Fame.

References

Swedish swimming coaches
Living people
1950 births
People from Landskrona Municipality
Sportspeople from Skåne County